Gorica Bridge over the Osum river is a landmark in the city of Berat, Albania.

It is one of the oldest and most popular Ottoman bridges in Albania. It connects two parts of Berat, was originally built from wood in 1780 and was rebuilt with stone in the 1920s. The bridge was renovated in year 2015 by Bashkia Berat (the Municipality of Berat).

According to local legend, the original wooden bridge contained a dungeon in which a girl would be incarcerated and starved to appease the spirits responsible for the safety of the bridge.

References 

Ottoman bridges in Albania
Buildings and structures in Berat
Tourist attractions in Berat